A tile is a manufactured piece of hard-wearing material.

Tile  or Tiles may also refer to:

Places
 Tile (Martian crater)
 Tile, Somalia
 Tile Ridge, in Antarctica

Games 
 Tile (dominoes), a playing piece in dominoes
 Tile, a game piece in a tile-based game
 Tile, the art of the playing area in a tile-based video game

Computing and technology
 Tile (company), a maker of tracking devices called tiles
 Tile, a computing unit in a tile processor
 Apache Tiles; see Java view technologies and frameworks

Decorative art, interior design 
 Fireclay Tile, a Northern California company manufacturing architectural tile
 National Tile Contractors Association

Building material tile 
Cement tile
Glass tile
Glazed architectural terra-cotta tile
Malibu tile
Medieval letter tile
Porcelain tile
Quarry tile
Saltillo tile
Uranium tile
Vitrified tile
Vinyl composition tile

Other uses
 Tiles (band)
 Julio César Arzú (born 1954), a Honduran footballer nicknamed Tile
 Tile, an alternative name for the mythical land of Thule

See also
 
 Tiler (Masonic)
 Tilera TILE64 a 64-way multi-core central processor unit
 Tiling (disambiguation)
 Tessellation, in computer graphics and mathematics
 Tyle (disambiguation)